Marsden High School (MHS) is a school located in Meadowbank, New South Wales, Australia. It is a co-educational high school operated by the New South Wales Department of Education with students from years 7 to 12. The school was established in 1959.

History
Established in January 1959, Marsden High was originally named Ermington High School until March 1959, when it gained its present name. It was located on at Winbourne Street, West Ryde.

On 26 June 2018, the NSW Government announced that Marsden High School will be moving to the new education precinct at Meadowbank which is to be built on part of the TAFE NSW Meadowbank campus. The school was relocated from Winbourne street to the new purposely built site and opened in 27 April 2022. The old site on Winbourne street is under construction to be rebuilt as a new multisport facility.

Notable alumni

 Professor Margaret Gardner AO, economist and Vice-Chancellor of the Royal Melbourne Institute of Technology
 Greg Matthews, former NSW and Australian Test Cricketer
 Dan Parks, former Scottish Rugby Union player
 Kim Williams AM, media executive
 Leigh Hatcher, Australian journalist and author
 Luke Fowler, entrepreneur

Notable teachers
 Richard Gill OAM, conductor and music director of the Victorian Opera, taught music at Marsden

See also 
 List of government schools in New South Wales
 Electoral district of Ryde
 Division of Bennelong
 City of Ryde

References

External links 
 Marsden High School website
 New South Wales Department of Education and Communities - Marsden High School

Public high schools in Sydney
1959 establishments in Australia
Educational institutions established in 1959
West Ryde, New South Wales